Akita Prefectural Budokan, is an indoor arena located in Araya, Akita, Akita, Japan.

Facilities
Large dojo
Small dojo
Sumo rings
Japanese archery courts
Judojo
Kendo hall

Events
National Sports Festival of Japan (2007)

References

Location map

Dōjō
Indoor arenas in Japan
Buildings and structures completed in 2004
Sports venues completed in 2004
Sports venues in Akita Prefecture